The round ligament of the liver (or ligamentum teres, or ligamentum teres hepatis) is a ligament that forms part of the free edge of the falciform ligament of the liver. It connects the liver to the umbilicus. It is the remnant of the left umbilical vein. The round ligament divides the left part of the liver into medial and lateral sections.

Structure 
The round ligament connects the liver to the umbilicus. It divides the left part of the liver into medial and lateral sections.

Development 
The round ligament of the liver is the remnant of the umbilical vein during embryonic development. It only exists in placental mammals. After the child is born, the umbilical vein degenerates to fibrous tissue.

The left portal vein (which gives branches to paraumbilical veins) is connected to the round ligament (ligamentum teres) and ligamentum venosum.

Clinical significance

Portal hypertension 
In adulthood, small paraumbilical veins remain in the substance of the ligament. These act as an important portacaval anastomosis in severe portal hypertension, resulting in a caput medusae.

Abscess 
Very rarely, the round ligament of the liver may develop an abscess. This usually requires liver surgery to treat.

Landmark 
The umbilical vein/round ligament inserts around the umbilicus, and is an important landmark of the inner surface of the anterior abdominal wall.

Additional Images

See also 

 Ligamentum venosum
 Ligamentum arteriosum

References

External links
  - "Stomach, Spleen and Liver: The Visceral Surface of the Liver"
 
 Overview at ucc.edu
 Illustration of Liver Anatomy including ligaments and structures

Ligaments of the torso
Hepatology